Ibrahim Koné (born 30 January 1995) is an Ivorian professional footballer. He plays for Egyptian club Ghazl El Mahalla as an attacking midfielder.

Career
Koné played for Saxan and Sheriff Tiraspol in Moldova, then Slutsk in Belarus, before moving to Egypt to join Haras El Hodoud and Tala'ea El Gaish.

References

External links 
 
 

1995 births
Living people
Ivorian footballers
Association football midfielders
Ivorian expatriate footballers
Expatriate footballers in Moldova
Expatriate footballers in Belarus
Expatriate footballers in Egypt
FC Saxan players
FC Sheriff Tiraspol players
FC Slutsk players
Haras El Hodoud SC players
Tala'ea El Gaish SC players
Ghazl El Mahalla SC players